Michel Larue (born 1966) is a former Canadian international lawn bowler.

Bowls career
Larue has represented Canada at two Commonwealth Games; at the 2006 Commonwealth Games and the 2010 Commonwealth Games.

He won two medals at the 2003 Asia Pacific Bowls Championships including a gold medal in the pairs, with Keith Roney at Pine Rivers Memorial BC, in Brisbane, Australia.

He won a Canadian National title in 2010.

References

Canadian male bowls players
1966 births
Living people
Bowls players at the 2006 Commonwealth Games
Bowls players at the 2010 Commonwealth Games